Eddins is a surname. Notable people with the surname include:

Boyd L. Eddins (born 1933), American politician
Rick L. Eddins, American politician
Robert Eddins (1988–2016), American football linebacker
William Eddins (born 1964), American pianist and conductor

See also
Joel Eddins House